Jean-Claude Périsset (born 13 April 1939) is a Swiss titular archbishop of the Roman Catholic Church and diplomat of the Holy See. He served as Apostolic Nuncio to Germany from 2007 until his resignation in 2013.

Biography

Périsset was born on 13 April 1939 in Estavayer-le-Lac, Switzerland. He was ordained as a priest on 28 June 1964. 

To prepare for a diplomatic career he entered the Pontifical Ecclesiastical Academy in 1967.

On 16 November 1996, he was appointed Titular Bishop of Accia and was named the secretary of the Pontifical Council for Promoting Christian Unity. 

On 12 November 1998, Périsset was named the Titular Archbishop of Justiniana Prima and was appointed Apostolic Nuncio to Romania.

On 22 March 2003, he was named the Nuncio to Moldova as well. On 15 October 2007, he was appointed the Nuncio to Germany, where he served until his resignation due to old age on 21 September 2013. He was succeeded by Nikola Eterović.

See also
 List of heads of the diplomatic missions of the Holy See

References

External links
 Jean-Claude Périsset in catholic-hierarchy.org 

1939 births
Living people
Roman Catholic titular archbishops
Apostolic Nuncios to Germany
Apostolic Nuncios to Moldova
Apostolic Nuncios to Romania
Swiss Roman Catholic archbishops